Riverside Hotel may refer to:

Riverside Hotel (Clarksdale, Mississippi)
Riverside Hotel (St. Francis, Minnesota), listed on the NRHP in Minnesota
Riverside Hotel (Reno), listed on the NRHP in Nevada
Riverside Hotel, a 1984 song by Kiyotaka Sugiyama & Omega Tribe

See also 
Riverside Inn (disambiguation)